Francis Watson may refer to:

 Francis Watson (art historian) (1907–1992), British art historian
 Francis Watson (cricketer) (1860–1930), New Zealand cricketer and schoolteacher
 Francis Watson (footballer) (born 1995), Australian rules footballer
 Francis Watson (politician) (1864–1947), British politician
 Francis Watson (priest) (died 1876), Dean of Leighlin
 Francis Watson (theologian) (born 1956), English theologian
 Francis Harold Watson (1854–1905), Southern African traveller, hunter and trader
 Buzz Watson (Francis Watson), fictional television character

See also
Frank Watson (disambiguation)